Hamid Ismailov born May 5, 1954 in Tokmok, Kyrgyzstan, is an Uzbek journalist and writer who was forced to flee Uzbekistan in 1992 and came to the United Kingdom, where he took a job with the BBC World Service. He left the BBC on 30 April 2019 after 25 years of service. His works are banned in Uzbekistan.

Life and career
Ismailov graduated from the military school of communication and later several departments of Tashkent University (Biology, Law, Management)

Ismailov has published dozens of books in Uzbek, Russian, French, German, Turkish and other languages. Among them books of poetry: "Сад" (Garden) (1987), "Пустыня" (Desert) (1988); of visual poetry: "Post Faustum" (1990), "Книга Отсутстви" (1992); novels "Собрание Утончённых" (1988), Le vagabond flamboyant (1993), Hay-ibn-Yakzan (2001), Hostage to Celestial Turks (2003), "Дорога к смерти больше чем смерть" (The road to death is bigger than death) (2005), and many others. He has translated Russian and Western classics into Uzbek, and Uzbek and Persian classics into Russian and some Western languages.

At the end of the 1980s he created a fictional literary group 'Conference of Refined', consisting of successfully published and acclaimed heteronym poets, philosophers, literary critics, writers and translators.
During the same period, he wrote a great number of academic articles mostly on literature and Uzbek mentality, which later he placed on the Academia website .

At the beginning of the 1990s, Ismailov collaborated with French composer Michel Karsky in creating several examples of sonic or musical poetry pieces like 'Babylon eclatee' or 'Hourglass/Le pas dernier' 

Ismailov's novel The Railway, originally written before he left Uzbekistan, was the first to be translated into English, by Robert Chandler, and was published in 2006.  A Russian edition was published in Moscow in 1997 under the pseudonym Altaer Magdi. Another novel, A Poet and Bin-Laden (English translation of "Дорога к смерти больше чем смерть"), translated by Andrew Bromfield, was published in September 2012. His triptych of novels, "Мбобо", in English The Underground (published worldwide by Restless Book, Googling for Soul, and Two Lost to Life have also been translated into English.
His book "The Dead Lake" (English translation of "Вундеркинд Ержан" by Andrew Bromfield) was published by Peirene Press early in 2014. His novel "The Devils' Dance" was published by Tilted Axis Press in 2018. It won the EBRD Literary Prize in 2019. His novel "Manaschi", translated into English by Donald Rayfield, was published by Tilted Axis Press in 2021 (the book has not been published in the original Uzbek).

On 30 April 2010, the BBC announced Ismailov's appointment as Writer in Residence for BBC World Service for two years. The blog was launched on 10 May 2010.
On the 31 December 2014 Hamid Ismailov announced on his Facebook and Twitter accounts that he stops his tenure which lasted 4,5 years. 
In June 2012, Ismailov represented Uzbekistan at the Poetry Parnassus in London. He took part in many literary festivals, including Hay , Edinburgh , Brooklyn , Berlin , Lahore  and many others. In 2022 he had a US Universities literary tour, which started with a Retrospective Symposium of his work at Yale University . He gave lectures at a number of universities, including Ann Arbor , Chicago , Berkeley , Stanford  and others.

Exile and ban 
Hamid fled Uzbekistan in 1992 after the Islam Karimov regime opened a criminal case against Ismailov. The authorities said Ismailov was trying to overthrow the government and received threats against his family and attacks on his home. His works are still banned in the country. He is a vocal critic of the country's government and its poor human rights record and censorship.

Works

Poetry 
 Сад (Garden) (1987)
 Пустыня (Desert) (1988)
 Post Faustum (1990)
 Книга Отсутстви (1992)

Novels 
 Собрание Утончённых ("Conference of the Refined", 1988)
 Hay-ibn-Yakzan (2001). Of Strangers and Bees, trans. Shelley Fairweather-Vega (2019)
 Hostage to Celestial Turks (2003, as Nouman Smyles)
 Дорога к смерти больше чем смерть (lit. "The Road to Death Is Bigger Than Death", 2005). A Poet and Bin-Laden, trans. Andrew Bromfield (2012)
 Железная дорога (1997). The Railway, trans. Robert Chandler (2006)
 Мбобо (2009). The Underground, trans. Carol Ermakova (2015)
 Googling for Soul (2004)
 Two Lost to Life
 Вундеркинд Ержан (lit. "Wunderkind Yerzhan", 2011). The Dead Lake, trans. Andrew Bromfield (2014)
 Jinlar basmi yoxud katta o'yin (2012). The Devils' Dance, trans. Donald Rayfield and John Farndon (2018)
 Gaia, Queen of Ants, trans. Shelley Fairweather-Vega (2020)
 Amber or Good Morning, Midnight (2020, unpublished) 
 Manaschi, trans. Donald Rayfield (2021)
 Русская Матрёшка (Russian Matryoshka, unpublished)
 Bizkim - komputerlar (2022, to be published in episodes on Telegram)

Translation 
Mashrab: Le Vagabond Flamboyant (translated from the Uzbek into French with J.-P.Balpe, 1993)
Alisher Navoi “Ghazales” (translated from the Uzbek into French with J.-P.Balpe, 1993)
”Anthologie de la Poesie d’Ouzbekistan” (in 2 volumes, translated from the Uzbek into French with J.-P.Balpe, 2008)

Notes

References
 Brief Biography

External links
Official website
"Conference of the Refined" Uzbek and Russian works under a variety of pseudonyms.
On the poetics of Lorca's "Divan of Tamarit" by Hamid Ismailov. Translated into English by Natalya Khan & Saodat I. Bazarova. Transoxiana 7 – Diciembre 2003. Original Russian text at К поэтике "Дивана Тамарита" Лорки
Two Lost for Life (fragment) -

Further reading

 KOCIEJOWSKI, Marius. God's Zoo: Artists, Exiles, Londoners (Carcanet, 2014) contains a biographical chapter "A Ghostly Hum of Parallel Lines – Hamid Ismailov, Writer, and Razia Sultanova, Musician"
 

1954 births
Living people
Uzbekistani writers
20th-century Uzbekistani poets
Uzbekistani journalists
Uzbekistani emigrants to the United Kingdom
Uzbekistani male poets
20th-century male writers